Viper class is a Type PC-40 fiberglass patrol craft of the Indonesian Navy. It was commissioned from 20 October 2006 by Indonesian National Armed Forces Commander Marshal Djoko Suyanto.

There are a total of six craft in this class, Viper, Piton, Weling, Matacora, Tedung Selar, Boiga.As 2018 four craft remained in service while two craft were decommissioned.

Armaments
The vessel is equipped with Russian-made 25 mm and 12.7 mm calibre machine guns. It also has a combat information room, a communication room and an ammunition store room.

Notable deployments
 KAL Viper helped recover some of the bodies from the ferry .

References

2006 ships
Patrol vessels of the Indonesian Navy
Naval ships of Indonesia